Rudolf Raimann (7 May 1861, Veszprém, Hungary – 26 September 1913, Vienna, Austria) was a Hungarian composer. For many years he worked as the chief composer and music director to Prince Esterházy. He composed 15 operas and operettas for the court, of which Enoch Arden is considered his best work. He also wrote numerous art songs and songs for the piano-forte.

Selected operas 
 Enoch Arden, performed on 8 May 1894 in Budapest
 Das Wäschermädel, performed in Vienna on 19 April 1905
 Paula macht alles, performed in Vienna on 27 March 1909
 Die Frau Gretl, performed in Vienna on 7 April 1911
 Unser Stammhalter, performed on 15 November 1912 in Vienna

Sources 
 The Oxford Dictionary of Opera, by John Warrack and Ewan West (1992), 
 Opera Glass

External links 
 

1861 births
1913 deaths
19th-century classical composers
19th-century Hungarian people
Esterházy family
Hungarian classical composers
Hungarian opera composers
Hungarian male classical composers
Male opera composers
People from Veszprém
19th-century male musicians